The University of Kabianga is located in Kabianga Division in Kericho West District. The university is situated in the Kabianga Complex, comprising the then Kabianga Famers Training Center, Kabianga High School and Primary School and the Kipsigis County Council Tea Farm. The Kabianga Complex has a long history.

History
The Government School, Kabianga, was started in 1925. Kabianga Teachers’ Training College existed between 1929 and 1963, when the College was moved to the present Kericho Teachers Training College. After the relocation, Kabianga Farmers Training Centre was established in 1959 at the premises. Its objective was to serve as an Agricultural Training facility for farmers from the South Rift and beyond. Kabianga Farmers Training Centre became Kabianga Campus of Moi University in May 2007. In May 2009, the university campus was elevated to a university college. On 1 March 2013, it was awarded charter by H.E, Hon. Mwai Kibaki and became a fully fledged university.

Location
The university is situated in the tea-growing highlands of Kericho in the southwestern end of the Rift Valley Province of Kenya and within the proximity of the multinational tea growing companies, Unilever, James Finlay, and George Williamson. It is located approximately 26 km from Kericho town and is about 6.2 km off-road a junction called Kabianga Dairies, formerly 'Premier Dairies' on Kericho-Kisii road.
Nearby shopping centers are Chepnyogaa market and Kabianga market. These markets are known for high-value cattle auctions and other businesses.

The surrounding community consists of the Kipsigis speakers. This community is known for mixed farming. The main agricultural activity being dairy farming.

Current status
The University of Kabiange joins the list of the recently established universities with a view of creating more learning opportunities. Currently the university has over 3800 students. 
The University of Kabianga is located in Kericho in Kenya.

Academics 
The University of Kabianga offers academic programmes at the undergraduate and graduate levels. The schools include:

 School of Science & Technology
 Information Science & Knowledge Management
 Education
 Directorate of Gender
 Business & Economics
 Arts & Social Sciences
 Agriculture & Biotechnology
 Natural Resources & Environmental Management

References

External links

Universities and colleges in Kenya
Educational institutions established in 2013
2013 establishments in Kenya
Kericho County
Education in Rift Valley Province